Anthousa ( meaning "in blossom") is a suburban town in Athens  East Attica regional unit, Greece. Since the 2011 local government reform it is part of the municipality Pallini, of which it is a municipal unit. The municipal unit has an area of 3.865 km2.

Geography

Anthousa is situated in the eastern part of the Athens conurbation, at about 300 m elevation. It lies in the southern foothills of the Penteliko Mountain. It is 3 km north of Pallini, 2 km south of Penteli and 14 km northeast of Athens city centre. Motorway 6 passes southwest of Anthousa.

Historical population

See also 
 List of municipalities of Attica

References

External links 
 GTP Travel Pages (Community)

Populated places in East Attica